The 2014 EHF European Men's Handball Championship was the 11th edition of the tournament and held in Denmark from 12–26 January. Hungary/Croatia (jointly) were the other applicants for the championship.

Denmark was awarded the championship on the EHF Congress in Copenhagen 25 September 2010 with 24 votes. Hungary/Croatia got 22 votes. Denmark was automatically qualified as hosting nation, and as defending champions as well. After the final, at total of 316,390 spectators had visited the stadiums. An all time EHF record.

France won their third title after defeating Denmark 41–32 in the final.

Venues

Referees
On 23 October 2013, 12 couples were announced in Vienna.

Qualification

Qualified teams

1 Bold indicates champion for that year. Italics indicates host.

Squads

Seeding
The draw was held on 21 June 2013 in Herning at 18:00 local time. The seeding was announced on 18 June 2013.

Group stage
All times are local (UTC+1).

Group A
Venue: Jyske Bank Boxen, Herning

Group B
Venue: Gigantium, Aalborg

Group C
Venue: NRGi Arena, Aarhus

Group D
Venue: Brøndby Hall, Brøndby

Main round

Group I
Venue: Jyske Bank Boxen, Herning

Group II
Venue: NRGi Arena, Aarhus

Knockout stage
Venue: Jyske Bank Boxen, Herning

Bracket

Semifinals

Fifth place game

Third place game

Final

Ranking and statistics

Final ranking
The final ranking for places 7 to 16 were determined by the team's group stage record.

All Star Team
The All-star team and award winners were announced on 26 January 2014.

Other awards

Top goalscorers

Source: EHF.com

References

External links

 
2014
European Men's Handball Championship
2014 European Men's Handball Championship
European Men's Handball Championship
January 2014 sports events in Europe
Brøndby Municipality
Sport in Aalborg
Sport in Aarhus
Sport in Herning